Deshamanya (Pride of the Nation) is the second-highest national honour of Sri Lanka awarded by the Government of Sri Lanka as a civil honour. It is awarded for "highly meritorious service", and is conventionally used as a title or prefix to the recipient's name.

Recipients

1986
 P. R. Anthonis – surgeon and academic 
 Gamani Corea – economist, civil servant and diplomat
 M. C. M. Kaleel
 Malage George Victor Perera Wijewickrama Samarasinghe
 Miliani Sansoni – Chief Justice of Ceylon
 Victor Tennekoon – Chief Justice of Ceylon

1987
 Edwin Felix Dias Abeysinghe
 Neville Kanakeratne – diplomat
 V. Manicavasagar – Supreme Court Justice, Chancellor University of Jaffna
 Wijetunga Mudiyansela Tillekeratne

1988
 Hector Wilfred Jayewardene – lawyer, member United Nations Commission on Human Rights
 Thambiah Sivagnanam

1989
 Shiva Pasupati – Solicitor General of Sri Lanka, Attorney General of Sri Lanka

1990
 Sepala Attygalle – Commander of the Army
 Nandadeva Wijesekera
 Badi-ud-din Mahmud – politician, Minister of Education
 Baku Mahadeva – civil servant
 Nanayakkara Wasam James Mudalige

1991
 E. L. Senanayake – politician, Speaker of the Parliament of Sri Lanka
 Montague Jayawickrama
 K. W. Devanayagam
 Nissanka Wijeyeratne – civil servant, politician
 Sivagamie Verina Obeyasekera
 Christopher Weeramantry
 Neville Ubesinghe Jayawardena
 Ivan Samarawickrema
 Chandirapal Chanmugam
 Abdul Caffoor Mohamed Ameer - Queen's Counsel, Attorney General of Sri Lanka

1992
 Abdul Bakeer Markar – Politician
 Hewa Komanage Dharmadasa
 Ananda Weihena Palliya Guruge
 E. L. B. Hurulle
 Abdul Majeed Mohamed Sahabdeen
 Suppiah Sharvananda
 Linus Silva
 Nissanka Wijewardane

1993
 Geoffrey Bawa – Architect
 C. A. Coorey
 Felix Stanley Christopher Perera Kalpage
 H. W. Thambiah
 Richard Udugama – Major General
 Ponna Wignaraja
 Noel Wimalasena

1994
 Jayantha Kelegama
 Lalith Kotelawala – Businessman
 Nandadasa Kodagoda – Academic
 Godfrey Gunatilleke
 Arulanandam Yesuadiam Samuel Gnanam
 Nugegoda Gabadage Pablis Panditharatna
 Surendra Ramachandran
 Deraniyagalage Basil Ivor Pieris Samaranayake Siriwardhana

1996
 Duleep Mendis – Sri Lanka national cricket captain
 Arjuna Ranatunga – Sri Lanka national cricket captain

1998
 Charitha Prasanna de Silva
 Ken Balendra – Businessman
 Doreen Winifred Wickramasinghe
 Tamara Kumari Illangaratne
 Elanga Devapriya Wickremanayake
 R. K. W. Goonesekera – Academic, Lawyer
 Vernon Mendis – Diplomat
 H. L. de Silva – Diplomat
 A. T. Kovoor – Academic
 Ranjit Abeysuriya – lawyer
 Duncan White – Olympic medalist
 Christopher Rajindra Panabokke
 W. D. Amaradeva – Music Director
 Chitrasena – Dancer

2005
 Kamalika Priyaderi Abeyaratne
 William Alwis
 Mahesh Amalean – Engineer and industrialist
 Sohli E. Captain
 Radhika Coomaraswamy – Academic, Human Rights Activist, Under-Secretary-General of the United Nations
 Lalith de Mel
 Rohan de Saram – Cellist
 Chandrananda de Silva
 Ashley de Vos – Architect
 Jayaratne Banda Dissanayake
 M. T. A. Furkhan
 D. Basil Goonesekera
 Cyril Herath – Inspector General of Police
 Asoka Kanthilal Jayawardhana
 A. S. Jayawarden – Sri Lankan economist and civil servant
 Harry Jayawardena – Businessman
 Nihal Jinasena – industrialist and sportsman
 Premasiri Khemadasa – Composer
 W. D. Lakshman
 Paddy Mendis – Air Chief Marshal
 Sunil Mendis – former Governor of the Central Bank of Sri Lanka
 J. B. Peiris – Senior Neurologist, Researcher and Pioneer of Neurology
 M. D. D. Peiris
 Denis Perera – Lieutenant General
 P. Ramanathan – Former Justice of the Supreme Court and Provincial Governor
 P. Deva Rodrigo
 Mano Selvanathan
 A. H. Sheriffdeen – Surgeon, academic and voluntary worker
 Roland Silva
 Bradman Weerakoon – Civil servant
 Kandekumara Hapudoragamage Jothiyarathna Wijayadasa
 Ray Wijewardene – Academic, Engineer

2007
 James Peter Obeyesekere III – Politician and aviator

2008
 Ramesh Mahendran

2017
 Abbasally Akbar
 K. M. de Silva
 Tissa Devendra
 Colvin Goonaratna
 Amaradasa Gunawardana
 Devanesan Nesiah
 Nandadasa Rajapaksha
 Priyani Soysa
 Latha Walpola
 Mineka Presantha Wickramasingha
 Bhanuka Wimalasooriya

2019
 Indrajit Coomaraswamy
 Ajith De Soyza
 Dr. Don Dilshan Abeywardane
 Merrill J. Fernando
 Mohan Munasinghe 
 Moragoda Christopher Walter Pinto
 Surath Wickremesinghe

References

External links
 National Awards Conferred by His Excellency the President of Sri Lanka

 
Civil awards and decorations of Sri Lanka